The 1979 Winnipeg Blue Bombers finished in 4th place in the Western Conference with a 4–12 record and failed to make the playoffs.

Offseason

CFL Draft

Roster

Preseason

Regular season

Standings

Schedule

Awards and honors
CFLPA's Most Outstanding Community Service Award – John Helton (DT)

CFL All-Stars
DT – John Helton

References

Winnipeg Blue Bombers seasons
1979 Canadian Football League season by team